The Lincolnshire Wildlife Trust, (part of the Wildlife Trusts partnership), covers the whole ceremonial county of Lincolnshire, England. It was founded in 1948 as a voluntary charitable organisation dedicated to conserving the wildlife and wild places of Lincolnshire and to promoting the understanding and enjoyment of the natural world.

Description 
Its headquarters are at Banovallum House, Manor House Street, Horncastle. These include five main visitor-focused reserves used for educational purposes:

Gibraltar Point National Nature Reserve opened in 1949 and was the first nature reserve to be purchased by the Trust. Facilities include two car parks and a visitors' centre with a cafe, shop and toilets.
Far Ings National Nature Reserve opened in 1973. Facilities provided include car parking, toilets, shop and classroom.
 Whisby Nature Park opened in 1989. A reserve of lakes, meadows and immature woodland situated in the west of the county alongside the A46 Lincoln by-pass. Facilities include car parking, an education centre with a laboratory and a classroom, an adventure playground for children and the 'Natural World Centre' with toilets, café, shop and temporary and permanent exhibitions. (The car parks, adventure playground and 'Natural World Centre' are managed by North Kesteven District Council).
Snipe Dales Country Park & Nature Reserve opened in 1974. A reserve that is part wet grassland and scrub and part conifer woodland situated in the centre of the county on the B1195 Horncastle to Spilsby road. The coniferous woodland is currently being replaced by native broadleaved trees. Facilities include car parking and toilets.
Deeping Lakes Nature Reserve opened in 2004. Only car parking is provided while the site is being developed.

The Trust employs 78 full and part-time staff who are aided by more than 1,300 volunteers drawn mainly from Trust's 16 area groups (members' groups), each of which is based on one of the county's main towns. The area groups also organise meetings, visits and social events and are involved in fundraising and membership recruitment.

5,000 of the Trust's members are under 16 years of age; these are catered for by the organisation's junior wing Wildlife Watch which runs seven groups around the county organising events for children.

The Trust's income is derived mainly from members' subscriptions, money raised by area groups and members, donations, grants from local authorities and government agencies (usually for special projects), profits from the Trust's sales business and from legacies.

Sites

Key

Public access

BPA = access only by prior arrangement with the Trust
No  = no public access
Yes = public access to all or most of the site

References

External links
Lincolnshire Wildlife Trust website

 
East Lindsey District
Organisations based in Lincolnshire
Wildlife Trusts of England
1948 establishments in England